The solute carrier family 18 member 2 (SLC18A2) also known as vesicular monoamine transporter 2 (VMAT2) is a protein that in humans is encoded by the SLC18A2 gene. SLC18A2 is an integral membrane protein that transports monoamines—particularly neurotransmitters such as dopamine, norepinephrine, serotonin, and histamine—from cellular cytosol into synaptic vesicles. In nigrostriatal pathway and mesolimbic pathway dopamine-releasing neurons, SLC18A2 function is also necessary for the vesicular release of the neurotransmitter GABA.

Binding sites and ligands
SLC18A2 is believed to possess at least two distinct binding sites, which are characterized by tetrabenazine (TBZ) and reserpine binding to the transporter. Amphetamine (TBZ site) and methamphetamine (reserpine site) bind at distinct sites on SLC18A2 to inhibit its function. SLC18A2 inhibitors like tetrabenazine and reserpine reduce the concentration of monoamine neurotransmitters in the synaptic cleft by inhibiting uptake through SLC18A2; the inhibition of SLC18A2 uptake by these drugs prevents the storage of neurotransmitters in synaptic vesicles and reduces the quantity of neurotransmitters that are released through exocytosis. Although many substituted amphetamines induce the release of neurotransmitters from vesicles through SLC18A2 while inhibiting uptake through SLC18A2, they may facilitate the release of monoamine neurotransmitters into the synaptic cleft by simultaneously reversing the direction of transport through the primary plasma membrane transport proteins for monoamines (i.e., the dopamine transporter, norepinephrine transporter, and serotonin transporter) in monoamine neurons. Other SLC18A2 inhibitors such as GZ-793A inhibit the reinforcing effects of methamphetamine, but without producing stimulant or reinforcing effects themselves.

Researchers have found that inhibiting the dopamine transporter (but not SLC18A2) will block the effects of amphetamine and cocaine; while, in another experiment, observing that disabling SLC18A2 (but not the dopamine transporter) prevents any notable action in test animals after amphetamine administration yet not cocaine administration. This suggests that amphetamine may be an atypical substrate with little to no ability to prevent dopamine reuptake via binding to the dopamine transporter but, instead, uses it to enter a neuron where it then interacts with SLC18A2 to induce efflux of dopamine from their vesicles into the cytoplasm whereupon dopamine transporters with amphetamine substrates attached move this recently liberated dopamine into the synaptic cleft.

Inhibition

SLC18A2 is essential for enabling the release of neurotransmitters from the axon terminals of monoamine neurons into the synaptic cleft. If SLC18A2 function is inhibited or compromised, monoamine neurotransmitters such as dopamine cannot be released into the synapse via typical release mechanisms (i.e., exocytosis resulting from action potentials).

Cocaine users display a marked reduction in SLC18A2 immunoreactivity. Sufferers of cocaine-induced mood disorders displayed a significant loss of SLC18A2 immunoreactivity; this might reflect damage to dopamine axon terminals in the striatum. These neuronal changes could play a role in causing disordered mood and motivational processes in more severely addicted users.

In popular culture 

Geneticist Dean Hamer has suggested that a particular allele of the SLC18A2 gene correlates with spirituality using data from a smoking survey, which included questions intended to measure "self-transcendence". Hamer performed the spirituality study on the side, independently of the National Cancer Institute smoking study. His findings were published in the mass-market book The God Gene: How Faith Is Hard-Wired into Our Genes. Hamer himself notes that SLC18A2 plays at most a minor role in influencing spirituality. Furthermore, Hamer's claim that the SLC18A2 gene contributes to spirituality is controversial. Hamer's study has not been published in a peer reviewed journal and a reanalysis of the correlation demonstrates that it is not statistically significant.

References

Further reading

External links 

Amphetamine
Biogenic amines
Molecular neuroscience
Neurotransmitter transporters
Receptors
Signal transduction
Solute carrier family
Articles containing video clips